Komissarovka is a rural locality (a settlement) in Posyolok Anopino, Gus-Khrustalny District, Vladimir Oblast, Russia. The population was 89 as of 2010.

Geography 
Komissarovka is located 25 km north of Gus-Khrustalny (the district's administrative centre) by road. Ivanovka is the nearest rural locality.

References 

Rural localities in Gus-Khrustalny District